Garrison O'Neal Brooks (born June 26, 1999) is an American professional basketball player for the Westchester Knicks of the NBA G League. He played college basketball for the North Carolina Tar Heels and the Mississippi State Bulldogs.

High school career
Brooks attended Auburn High School, in his freshman year he averaged 6.6 points, 9.2 rebounds, and 0.8 assists. During his sophomore year, he averaged 14.6 points, 10.6 rebounds, and 3.7 blocks. He also averaged 16.3 points, 11.2 rebounds and 2.7 blocks in his Junior year while in his senior year, he averaged 14.3 points, 9.1 rebounds and 2.3 blocks. He made 1,457 points and grabbed 1,116 rebounds in his four years at Auburn High School which made him the second player in Auburn High history with 1,000 or more in both categories. He also broke the school record for career blocks with 334 while he was named in the first-team all-state, all-region and all-area honors

College career
Brooks enrolled at North Carolina and was recruited by Roy Williams and Hubert Davis. In his freshman season, he averaged 4.5 points, 3.5 rebounds and 0.5 assists per game. In his sophomore year, he averaged 7.9 points, 5.6 rebounds and 1.3 assists per game. He worked on his mid range jumper so much after his sophomore season that he hurt his wrist.

As a junior, Brooks averaged 16.8 points and 8.5 rebounds per game. At the conclusion of the regular season, Brooks was selected to the Second Team All-ACC and was named Most Improved Player. 

Entering his senior season, Brooks was named to the preseason watch lists for the John R. Wooden Award, Naismith Trophy, and Karl Malone Award. The ACC conference media selected him as the preseason ACC Player of the Year. He averaged 10.2 points and 6.9 rebounds per game as a senior. Following the season, Brooks elected to transfer to Mississippi State for his final season of eligibility.

Professional career

Westchester Knicks (2022–present)
On October 23, 2022, Brooks joined the Westchester Knicks training camp roster.

Career statistics

College

|-
| style="text-align:left;"| 2017–18
| style="text-align:left;"| North Carolina
| 37 || 16 || 14.6 || .528 || – || .587 || 3.5 || .5 || .3 || .3 || 4.5
|-
| style="text-align:left;"| 2018–19
| style="text-align:left;"| North Carolina
| 36 ||  36 || 23.0 || .574 || – || .639 || 5.6 || 1.3 || .6 || .5 || 7.9
|-
| style="text-align:left;"| 2019–20
| style="text-align:left;"| North Carolina
| 32 || 31 || 34.9 || .535 || .286 || .641 || 8.5 || 2.0 || .5 || .5 || 16.8
|-
| style="text-align:left;"| 2020–21
| style="text-align:left;"| North Carolina
| 28 || 25 || 28.0 || .469 || .500 || .606 || 6.9 || 1.4 || .7 || .8 || 10.2
|-
| style="text-align:left;"| 2021–22
| style="text-align:left;"| Mississippi State
| 34 || 34 || 30.3 || .458 || .342 || .692 || 6.6 || .8 || .4 || .8 || 10.4
|- class="sortbottom"
| style="text-align:center;" colspan="2"| Career
| 167 || 142 || 25.7 || .510 || .352 || .636 || 6.1 || 1.2 || .5 || .6 || 9.7

See also
 List of NCAA Division I men's basketball career games played leaders

References

External links
Mississippi State Bulldogs bio
North Carolina Tar Heels bio

1999 births
Living people
American men's basketball players
Auburn High School (Alabama) alumni
Basketball players from Alabama
Mississippi State Bulldogs men's basketball players
North Carolina Tar Heels men's basketball players
Power forwards (basketball)
Sportspeople from Auburn, Alabama
Westchester Knicks